El Garrasí is a 33-RPM LP album by Venezuelan composer/arranger/conductor Aldemaro Romero, released in 1959, with the record label Cymbal.

The album features popular Venezuelan pieces, continuing with the modernization of Venezuelan folk music, upgrading it from folk instrumentations to full modern orchestral versions, and making it palatable to international audiences, and the presentation of two compositions by Romero, El Garrasí and Dos Golondrinas.

Romero explains at the back cover of the album, the process of recording, the origin of his new compositions and his travel to New York City.

Track listing

Miscellanea
The album was recorded in October 1958 at the Columbia Recording Company studios in New York City.
The Garrasí is part of the Venezuelan plains popular clothing. 
Some of the musicians at the recording were part of the NBC Symphony Orchestra, Metropolitan Opera House, and the New York Philharmonic.

1959 albums
Aldemaro Romero albums
Albums produced by Aldemaro Romero